Blackdyke is a hamlet in the civil parish of Holme Low in Cumbria, United Kingdom. A railway station existed at Blackdyke Halt on the line to Silloth until 1964.

See also

Listed buildings in Holme Low
List of places in Cumbria

References

Hamlets in Cumbria
Allerdale